Etherian may refer to:

Hugh Etherian, also called Hugo Etherianus, 12th-century scholar
Leo Etherian, called Leo Tuscus, 12th-century scholar
Etherian, of the dimension of Etheria in the theory of Meade Layne

See also
Etheria (disambiguation)